Route 178 is a bus route that operates in England between Brislington and Radstock.

The route formerly ran from Bristol to Bath. It was cut back to Radstock in 2016 and the Sunday service was withdrawn.

In December 2021, it was announced that the service would be withdrawn on 30 January 2022. However, the following month the decision was reversed and the route retained. In July 2022, it was again announced that the service would be withdrawn in October as part of wider service cuts due to decreased passenger numbers, driver shortages, and the expected withdrawal of government support for bus services. In September 2022, the West of England Combined Authority announced that the route would be retained and that it would be taken over by a new operator. However, the section between Bristol and Brislington has been withdrawn and so the northern terminus is now Brislington Park and Ride.

References 

Bus routes in England
Transport in Somerset
Radstock
Transport in Bristol